The Cat is a 1964 album by Jimmy Smith. It features Smith on Hammond B-3 organ with big band arrangements by composer Lalo Schifrin. The album reached number 12 on the Billboard 200 chart.

Track listing
"Theme from Joy House" (Lalo Schifrin) – 4:38
"The Cat" (from Joy House) (Lalo Schifrin, Rick Ward) – 3:24
"Basin Street Blues" (Spencer Williams) – 4:00
"Main Title from The Carpetbaggers" (Elmer Bernstein, Ray Colcord) – 3:56
"Chicago Serenade" (Eddie Harris) – 3:55
"St. Louis Blues" (W.C. Handy) – 3:18
"Delon's Blues" (Smith) – 4:48
"Blues in the Night" (Harold Arlen, Johnny Mercer) – 4:45

Personnel

Musicians

 Jimmy Smith – organ
 Ray Alonge – french horn
 Earl Chapin – french horn
 Bill Correa – french horn
 Jimmy Buffington – french horn
 Kenny Burrell – guitar
 Don Butterfield – tuba
 Jimmy Cleveland – trombone
 Urbie Green – trombone
  Billy Byers – trombone
 George Duvivier – bass
 Bernie Glow – trumpet
 Thad Jones – trumpet
 Jimmy Maxwell – trumpet
 Marky Markowitz – trumpet
 Ernie Royal – trumpet
 Snooky Young – trumpet
 Phil Kraus – percussion
 Tony Studd – bass trombone
 Grady Tate – drums

Technical
 Creed Taylor – producer 
 Val Valentin – director of engineering
 Rudy Van Gelder – engineer
 Lalo Schifrin – arranger, conductor
 Ken Whitmore – photography
 Al Collins – liner notes

Chart performance

Album

Single

References

The Cat [CD liner notes]. 2005. The Verve Music Group.

1964 albums
Jimmy Smith (musician) albums
Verve Records albums
Albums produced by Creed Taylor
Albums conducted by Lalo Schifrin
Albums arranged by Lalo Schifrin